Mount Naomi Wilderness is a  wilderness area located within the Uinta-Wasatch-Cache National Forest in the U.S. state of Utah.  It lies between the Logan River and the Utah-Idaho state line northeast of Logan, Utah.

Topography
Mount Naomi Wilderness consists of wooded, mountainous terrain. It stands near the eastern boundary of the wilderness area, while the western side is many deep canyons.

Recreation
Common recreational activities in Mount Naomi Wilderness include hiking, camping, horseback riding, hunting, and wildlife watching.  Tony Grove Lake and White Pine Lake, the latter accessible only by hiking, are popular destinations. In late July and August wildflowers grow in abundance.

See also
 Wilderness Act
 National Wilderness Preservation System
 List of U.S. Wilderness Areas

References

External links

 Mount Naomi Wilderness - Wilderness.net
 Mount Naomi Wilderness - GORP
 Mount Naomi Wilderness Area - Wasatch-Cache National Forest

Wilderness areas of Utah
Protected areas of Cache County, Utah
Wasatch-Cache National Forest